San Juan de Guadalupe is a city and seat of the municipality of San Juan de Guadalupe, in the state of Durango, north-western Mexico.  As of 2010, the town of San Juan de Guadalupe had a population of 1,712.

References

Populated places in Durango